Plāņi Parish is an administrative unit of Valmiera Municipality in Vidzeme, Latvia.

Towns, villages and settlements of Plāņi Parish

References 

Parishes of Latvia
Valmiera Municipality
Vidzeme